Dongjak District (Dongjak-gu) is one of the 25 gu that make up the city of Seoul, South Korea. Its name was derived from the Dongjaegi Naruteo Ferry, on the Han River which borders the district to the north. It was the 17th gu created in Seoul, after being separated from Gwanak District on 1 April 1980.

Administrative divisions

Dongjak District is divided into 15 dong:

Daebang-dong
Heukseok-dong (all of this dong was combined in January 2008)
Noryangjin-dong 1, 2 (Bon-dong was combined with Noryangjin 1-dong in September 2008)
Sadang-dong 1, 2, 3, 4, 5 (Dongjak-dong was combined with Sadang 2-dong in September 2008)
Sangdo-dong 1, 2, 3, 4 (2 and 5 dong were combined in January 2008)
Sindaebang-dong 1, 2

Education
Dongjak District is home to Chongshin University, the Seoul campus of Chung-Ang University, and Soongsil University.

Noryangjin-dong, especially near Noryangjin Station is known for private institutes or Hagwons, for college admission test and civil service examinations.

Transportation

Railways
Korail
Seoul Subway Line 1
(Yeongdeungpo-gu) ← Daebang — Noryangjin → (Yongsan-gu)
Seoul Metro
Seoul Subway Line 2 Circle Line
(Seocho-gu) ← Sadang → (Gwanak-gu) ← Sindaebang → (Guro-gu)
Seoul Subway Line 4
(Yongsan-gu) ← Dongjak — Isu — Sadang Station → (Seocho-gu)
Seoul Subway Line 7
(Seocho-gu) ← Isu — Namseong — Soongsil University — Sangdo — Jangseungbaegi — Sindaebangsamgeori → (Yeongdeungpo-gu)
Seoul Metro Line 9 Corporation
Seoul Subway Line 9
(Yeongdeungpo-gu) ← Noryangjin — Nodeul — Heukseok — Dongjak → (Seocho-gu)

Sister cities
 Surrey, British Columbia, Canada
 Pinggu, China
 Dunhua, Jilin, China
 Tahara, Aichi, Japan 
 Bayanzürkh, Mongolia

People from Dongjak District
 Lee Min-ho (Hangul: 이민호), actor, singer, model and top Hallyu star, known for his roles in television series like Boys Over Flowers, City Hunter, The Heirs, Legend of the Blue Sea and The King: Eternal Monarch.
 RM (born Kim Nam-joon, Hangul: 김남준), rapper, songwriter, record producer and leader of boyband BTS, one of the best selling artist in South Korea.

References

External links

 Dongjak-gu website (English version)

 
Districts of Seoul